The Northwest Parkway is a  road that runs from U.S. Highway 36 (US 36) to the Interstate 25 (I-25)/E-470 interchange. Both terminuses are in Broomfield, northwest of Denver. In combination with E-470 and State Highway 470 (SH 470), the Northwest Parkway forms a partial beltway of approximately  around the Denver metropolitan area. Some  lie between the west end of the Northwest Parkway and the northwest end of SH 470, the opposite end of the beltway.

The Northwest Parkway was funded entirely with private money and charges a $4.10 toll. Tolls may be paid using highway-speed electronic tolling.

Route description 
The Northwest Parkway begins as a continuation of E-470 westward. Following a stack interchange with I-25, the parkway crosses Huron Street in suburban Broomfield, surrounded by fields. After intersecting Sheridan Parkway, the route passes a small pond, followed by an underpass with Lowell Boulevard. Near Dillon Road, the parkway interchanges with US 287 in Lafayette before reentering Broomfield near the end of the toll portion at 96th Street. The parkway continues untolled for  before terminating at an interchange with US 36.

Tolls 
Tolls on the Northwest Parkway are charged based on a barrier toll system. It costs two-axle vehicles $4.10 for the barrier on the mainline plaza and $1.35 for the ramp gantries. ExpressToll and Go-Pass users do not pay processing fees, late fees, or any other fees in addition to the toll amount.

History 
The Northwest Parkway opened to the public in November 2003. In November 2005, a new intersection opened at Sheridan Boulevard in northern Broomfield. In August 2001, the cities of Westminster and Arvada put into motion the completion of an extension of the Northwest Parkway, sometimes termed W-470, to connect to SH 470, I-70, and US 6 in Golden. The city of Golden struck down the proposal, but, in a compromise with the Colorado Department of Transportation (CDOT), an environmental impact statement (EIS) was done. Most likely, Indiana Street and SH 93 would be used to complete the beltway.

Lease to foreign consortium
In 2007, the board of directors of the Northwest Parkway agreed to lease the operations of the highway to a consortium for 99 years. The two companies of the consortium are Brisa – Auto-estradas de Portugal and CCR S.A. According to the Boulder Daily Camera, this was the fourth time in two years that operations of an existing toll road in the US had been turned over to a private company under a long-term lease.

The Northwest Parkway had been consistently generating less income than envisioned when it was funded by three local governments—Broomfield, Lafayette, and Weld County. The parkway was built with $416.4 million (equivalent to $ in ) in bonds, to be paid back with toll revenue over 35 years. Due to the road's underuse, the bond debt was downgraded in 2006. Use in 2007 was 12,000 cars per day, well below the 18,500 expected by 2004, one year after opening.

Exit list

See also
State Highway 470
E-470

References

External links 

 Denver's 470 Saga
 Northwest Parkway official web site
 EXpressToll official web site

Toll roads in Colorado
Transportation in Boulder County, Colorado
Transportation in Broomfield, Colorado
Denver metropolitan area
Interstate 70
Freeways in the United States